Haarzuilens is a village in the Dutch province of Utrecht. It is a part of the municipality of Utrecht, and lies about 12 km west from the city centre of Utrecht. It was a separate municipality until 1954, when it was joined to the municipality of Vleuten.

In 2018, the village of Haarzuilens has about 500 inhabitants.

Pronounced “Harzollens” by the local Dutch inhabitants, the village was built around the turn of the 19th century after its predecessor and the local castle De Haar had been destroyed in a devastating fire. The trees surrounding the castle are said to have originated in a forest on the other side of Utrecht. Local lore has it that several houses in Utrecht were demolished in order to move the trees to their new location and to give the castle's landlord his forest without the decades of delay usually required to grow new trees. Nevertheless, the landlord allegedly went on a five-year honeymoon trip before the trees had been replanted.

It is famous for De Haar Castle, which is surrounded by gardens and which is the location of the annual Elf Fantasy Fair. The castle, after 1892 fully refurbished by the Baroness Hélène van Zuylen and owned by baron  since 2000, attracted 76,500 visitors in 2002.

References

External links

 

Populated places in Utrecht (province)
Former municipalities of Utrecht (province)